Los Daniels is a Mexican rock band formed in May 2007. The band is formed currently by Ismael Salcedo (lead vocals), Alfonso Díaz (bass guitar), Daniel Barrera (rhythm guitar), Miguel Ángel Ortiz (lead guitar) and Rasheed Durán (drums).
Released their first album  "Se renta cuarto para señoritas" (Room for rent - Only Ladies) in July 2007, under the label Iguana Records. Since then, Los Daniels have been presented at major festivals with impressive success as the Vive Latino '08 where about 90,000 people gathered, meeting at their anniversary day. They have been part of Corona Music. In 2009 they released their second album, entitled "Moodanza", an album that reflects maturity and reinforces its audience. They are currently promoting the new album Universo Paraíso.

Discography

Se renta cuarto para señoritas (2007)
Track listing
   
1. Te puedes matar - 3:08
2. Escaparme de aquí - 2:08
3. Hazme daño - 3:05
4. Fixión - 3:13
5. Lo que fuí ayer - 2:54
6. Dejemos que baile - 2:09
7. Cuando su reloj falló - 3:32
8. Todo se acabó - 3:39
9. No estaríamos aquí - 2:42

Moodanza (2009)
Charts  #84 (MEX) #10 (MEX ROCK)
Track listing

1. Junto a mi - 2:29 
2. En otra dimensión - 3:18
3. Sin luz - 3:16
4. Mooddanza - 3:26
5. Mientras caes - 3:18
6. Lejos - 2:48
7. Really sex - 2:54
8. Cuando esté contigo (coros de F. Curie Jetter) - 3:30
9. Al mas allá - 3:09
10. Solos - 3:00
11. El juego - 2:57
12. Contradicción - 2:51
13. Leal - 3:50
14. Todo se acabó - 3:39
15. Ficción (Electroacustic) (Bonus Track) - 3:24
16. Te puedes matar (Remix) (Bonus Track) - 4:06

A casa (2010)
Charts  #41 (MEX) #3 (MEX ROCK)
Track listing

 Cuentos
 Sin documentos
 Al más allá
 A casa
 Quisiera saber (Feat. Natalia Lafourcade)
 Really sex
 Se lo dejo al tiempo
 Ficción
 No lo puedes parar
 En otra dimensión
 Te puedes matar
 Quién me salve
 Ya no volverás
 Vuelvo

Amanecer (2013) 
Track listing

ROCK CABRÓN
 Amanecer
 Morena
 Lágrimas
 El viajante
 La escalera
 Tiro de gracia
 En el mismo tren
 Entre la hierba
 El loco
 Sabe mal (Feat. Pato Machete)
 Te deseo lo mejor

Inmortal (2016) 
Track listing

 Ahora
 Inmortal (En tí)
 Hasta las cenizas (Feat. Lila Downs)
 Desperté
 Lo sabía
 Perdóname
 Mujer
 Te seguiré
 Oportunidad
 10. Sólo tú

Universo Paraíso (2018) 
Track listing

 Uno para el Otro
 Dejarte Ir
 Vendrás por Mi
 La Niña de los Ojos Tristes
 Suéltame (feat. Claudio Valenzuela)
 Día con día
 Culpables
 Ya no sigas Corazón
 Cuerpos Sin Control
 Busca hacia Dentro
 Solo Baila para Mi
 Buscando canciones

References

External links
 Official Site
 MySpace

Musical groups established in 2007
Rock en Español music groups
Mexican rock music groups
Musical groups from Mexico City